Burra may refer to:

Places
Burra, South Australia, a pastoral centre and historic tourist town in the mid-north of South Australia
District Council of Burra (1872–1935)
District Council of Burra Burra (1935–1997)
Corporate Town of Burra (1876–1969)
Electoral district of The Burra (1857–1875)
Electoral district of Burra (1875–1902), (1938–1970)
Electoral district of Burra Burra {1902–1938}
 Burra, Shetland, the collective name for two of the Shetland Islands
 West Burra
 East Burra
 Burra, New South Wales, a locality located near Canberra, Australia
 Burra Parish (Murray County), a land administrative division, essentially identical with the above locality
 Burra Parish (Kennedy County), a land administrative division in central western New South Wales
 Burra Burra Mine (Tennessee), named after the South Australian mine

People
 Djambu "Sambo" Burra Burra (born 1946), noted Aboriginal Australian artist living at Ngukurr, NT
 Edward Burra (1905-1976), an English painter
 John Burra (born 1956), a Tanzanian long-distance runner
 Peter Burra (1909-1937), British literary critic

Other
Burra Charter, a charter relating to conservation of Australian heritage places
Burra, a common name of the Australian plant Eremophila fraseri
Burra or Burra Leiteira, a common name of the neotropical plant Sapium scleratum in genus Sapium

See also

Places including the spelling of Burra
Burra Burra Mine (disambiguation)
Burra Creek (disambiguation)

Similar names
Burray, one of the Orkney Islands in Scotland.
Barra (disambiguation)
Bura (disambiguation)